Batdorf & Rodney were an early-1970s folk rock duo consisting of John Batdorf and Mark Rodney.

Career
The two began performing in the summer of 1970 in Las Vegas.  They toured extensively with many of the most famous acts of the 1970s.  Their tours included playing at Carnegie Hall. They issued three albums on three different labels between 1971 and 1975, logging two chart hits during their final year after signing with Arista Records.  Their self-titled second album featured the track "Home Again," an FM radio staple that at 6:30 was perhaps too long to be a hit single. A track from their third album, "You Are a Song," written by Jim Weatherly, was released as a single and reached number 87 on the U.S. Billboard Hot 100 during the summer of 1975.  It also reached #19 on the Canadian Adult Contemporary chart.

Their other hit, a non-album single, was an early version of "Somewhere in the Night," which reached number 69 in December of that year.  Issued concurrently with Helen Reddy's version, the song became a Top 40 hit for her in 1976 and a Top 10 hit for Barry Manilow in 1979.  Another song, "All I Need," reached the Canadian Adult Contemporary chart in 1973, peaking at #79.

Batdorf & Rodney disbanded in 1975.  Remaining with Arista, Batdorf soon formed the group Silver then released "Wham Bam" in 1976, the most successful single of his career, which reached #16 on the Billboard Hot 100. In 2008, the duo reunited to record an album titled Still Burnin'.

References

American folk rock groups
Folk rock duos
American musical duos